Raymond-Knowles Union Elementary School District is a public school district in Madera County, California, United States.

References

External links
 

School districts in Madera County, California

Raymond-Knowles Union Elementary School is an Elementary school in Raymond, California with a zip code of 93653.